Ingles is an Old English surname. Notable people with the surname include:

William Ingles (1729-1782), soldier and judge in Colonial Virginia 
Mary Draper Ingles (1732-1815), American pioneer who escaped from captivity by Shawnee Indians
H. Gil Ingles, Angolan record producer
Harry C. Ingles (1888–1976), United States Army general
Henry Ingles (1840–1892), New Zealand politician
J. Lewis Ingles, American football coach
Joe Ingles (born 1987), Australian basketball player
Juanmi (footballer, born 1971), Juan Miguel García Inglés, Spanish footballer
Paul Ingles (born 1956), American radio personality

See also
Inglis (surname)
Ingle (surname)
Inglese, surname
Ingalls (disambiguation), includes a list of people with surname Ingalls

Ethnonymic surnames
de:Inglés